Bodeok-dong is an administrative dong or a neighbourhood in the administrative subdivisions of the Gyeongju City, North Gyeongsang province, South Korea. It consists of seven legal dong including Cheongun-dong, Sinpyeong-dong, Bukgun-dong, Sogok-dong, Deok-dong, Hwangnyeong-dong and Amgok-dong

It is bordered by Yangbuk-myeon on the east, Wolseong-dong and Dongcheon-dong on the west, Bulguk-dong on the south and Cheonbuk-myeon and Pohang city on the north. Its 80.97 square kilometers are home to about 2,194 people. The population is served by one elementary school.

See also
Subdivisions of Gyeongju
Administrative divisions of South Korea

References

External links
 The official site of the Bodeok-dong office

Subdivisions of Gyeongju
Neighbourhoods in South Korea